Francesca Stavrakopoulou (born 3 October 1975) is a British biblical scholar and broadcaster. She is currently Professor of Hebrew Bible and Ancient Religion at the University of Exeter. The main focus of her research is on the Hebrew Bible, and on Israelite and Judahite history and religion.

She also popularises biblical historical subjects as a TV presenter on BBC2 and Channel 4. She comments on the historicity of the Bible and Hebrew Bible (Old Testament) narratives, the role of women in the Abrahamic religions and the development of the Biblical texts.

Early life and education
Francesca Stavrakopoulou was born on 3 October 1975 to an English mother and a Greek father. Stavrakopoulou was brought up in no particular religion and is a self-described atheist. She was educated at the Godolphin and Latymer School and won an exhibition to Worcester College, Oxford.

Career
Stavrakopoulou was awarded a D.Phil. in theology by the University of Oxford. Her dissertation, which examined the creation of an imagined past within the Hebrew Bible, was subsequently published as King Manasseh and Child Sacrifice: Biblical Distortions of Historical Realities.

Stavrakopoulou filled subsequent teaching and research positions at Oxford at Worcester College, as a Junior Research Fellow and as a Career Development Fellow in the Faculty of Theology, departing Oxford in 2005.

Stavrakopoulou began a position in Hebrew Bible and Ancient Religion in the University of Exeter's Department of Theology and Religion in 2005, rising to the level of senior lecturer by March 2011. She served as Head of Theology and Religion at Exeter between 2013 and 2016.

In 2011, Stavrakopoulou was secretary of the British-based Society for Old Testament Study in 2011, and member of the European Association of Biblical Studies and of the US-based Society of Biblical Literature.

Her 2021 book, God: An Anatomy, was shortlisted for the 2022 Wolfson History Prize.

Public appearances and presentations

Stavrakopoulou has appeared on several occasions in BBC One's programme featuring "moral, ethical and religious debates," The Big Questions hosted by Nicky Campbell; appearances include on the topics "Is the Bible still relevant?",
 "Is there a difference between a religion and a cult?", and "Are religions unfair to women?"

Stavrakopoulou has served as writer and presenter for a number of media productions relating to her scholarly and political interests. She contributed to Channel 4's series The Bible: A History (2010), regarding the historicity of Moses. Her first primetime presentation was a three-part television series for the BBC2 The Bible's Buried Secrets (2011; not to be confused with NOVA's 2008 programme of the same name).

She is also a Patron of Humanists UK, and has spoken on the history of religion and religious depictions of female sexuality at the Humanists UK Annual Convention in 2016 and the 2014 World Humanist Congress in Oxford respectively.

Scholarly positions

The main focus of Stavrakopoulou's research is on the Hebrew bible, and on Israelite and Judahite history and religion. Stavrakopoulou supports the academic consensus that important figures in the Hebrew bible were not historical figures as represented in the text. She has further stated that she believes "very little, probably" of the Hebrew bible is historical fact, based on the arguments that ancient writers had an understanding of "fact" and "fiction" very different from a modern understanding, and that the Hebrew bible "wasn't written to be a factual account of the past"; she concludes, saying she does not believe accounts of Moses and King David in the Hebrew bible to be factual, and that "as an historian of the bible, I think there is very little that is factual". In her 2021 book, God: An Anatomy, Stavrakopoulou "presents a vividly corporeal image of God: a human-shaped deity who walks and talks and weeps and laughs, who eats, sleeps, feels, and breathes, and who is undeniably male. Here is a portrait–arrived at through the author’s close examination of and research into the Bible–of a god in ancient myths and rituals who was a product of a particular society, at a particular time, made in the image of the people who lived then, shaped by their own circumstances and experience of the world". This book has been described by John Barton as showing that the non-corporeal God of Judaism and Christianity "was not yet so in the Bible, where God appears in a much more corporeal form".

Major published works

Theses

Books
Stavrakopoulou's dissertation-based monograph, and her subsequent authored book-length publications are:

Edited

Journal articles and book chapters
Stavrakopoulou's major journal articles and her authored book chapters include:

References

Further reading

External links

 Stavrakopoulou Exeter faculty page.
 Stavrakopoulou Twitter page.
 

1975 births
Living people
Religion academics
Religious studies scholars
English television presenters
Academics of the University of Exeter
English atheists
People from Bromley
Alumni of the University of Oxford
English people of Greek descent
Female biblical scholars